The 1971 Macdonald Brier, Canada's national men's curling championship was held March 1–6 at the 2,800 seat Pavilion de la Jeunesse in Quebec City, Quebec.

A blizzard hit the city late in the week, and was blamed for low attendance. One draw had to be cancelled due to the blizzard, and curlers had to be shuttled from the rink to their hotels on snowmobiles.

Manitoba, Northern Ontario, and Saskatchewan all finished round robin play with 8-2 records, necessitating a tiebreaker playoff between the three teams to determine the Brier championship. Despite Saskatchewan defeating both Manitoba and Northern Ontario in round robin play, lots were drawn to determine the seeds. Team Manitoba won the draw and were given a bye into the final.

Team Manitoba, who was skipped by Dale Duguid ended up capturing the Brier Tankard by beating Northern Ontario in the final 11-6 as Northern Ontario skip Bill Tetley conceded in the final end. Northern Ontario earlier advanced to the final with a 10-9 victory over Saskatchewan.

This was Manitoba's eighteenth Brier championship overall. Duguid became only the fifth skip to ever win back-to-back Briers joining Gordon Hudson, Matt Baldwin, Ernie Richardson (twice), and Ron Northcott to ever accomplish that feat. Duguid's team (Rod Hunter, Jim Pettapiece, and Bryan Wood) joined Richardson's 1959 and 1960 teams as they only rinks to have won back-to-back Briers with the same four team members.

Duguid's rink would represent Canada in the 1971 Air Canada Silver Broom, which was the men's world curling championship in which they also defended their title from the previous year.

After winning the 1971 World Championship, Duguid retired from competitive curling, and joined the CBC in 1972 as a curling commentator.

Teams

Round-robin standings

Round-robin results
All draw times are listed in Eastern Time (UTC−05:00)

Draw 1
Monday, March 1, 3:00 pm

Draw 2
Monday, March 1, 8:00 pm

Draw 3
Tuesday, March 2, 9:00 am

Draw 4
Tuesday, March 2, 2:30 pm

Draw 5
Wednesday, March 3, 2:30 pm

Draw 6
Wednesday, March 3, 8:00 pm

Draw 7
Thursday, March 4, 9:00 am

Draw 8
Thursday, March 4, 2:30 pm

Draw 9
Friday, March 5, 9:00 am

Draw 10
Friday, March 5, 2:30 pm

Draw 11
Friday, March 5, 8:00 pm

Tiebreakers

Semifinal
Saturday, March 6, 9:00 am

Final
Saturday, March 6, 1:00 pm

Awards

All-Star Team 
The media selected the following curlers as All-Stars.

Ross G.L. Harstone Award
The Ross Harstone Award was presented to the player chosen by their fellow peers as the curler who best represented Harstone's high ideals of good sportsmanship, observance of the rules, exemplary conduct and curling ability.

Notes

References
Curling Canada: 1971 Macdonald Brier
2018 Brier Media Guide: Previous Rosters
Results at Soudog Curling
Results at CurlingZone

1971 in curling
1971
Curling competitions in Quebec City
1971 in Quebec
March 1971 sports events in Canada
1971 in Canadian curling
1970s in Quebec City